The Dragon was a sailing event on the 1960 Summer Olympics sailing program in Naples. Seven races were scheduled. Eighty-one sailors, on 27 boats, from 27 nations competed.

Results

Daily standings

Conditions at Naples 
Of the total of three race areas were needed during the Olympics in Naples. Each of the classes was using the same scoring system. The southern course was used for the Dragon.

Notes

References 
 
 
 

 

Dragon
Dragon (keelboat) competitions